In Your Wildest Dreams may refer to:

 "In Your Wildest Dreams" (song), a song by Tina Turner and Barry White
 In Your Wildest Dreams (EP), an EP by Whiskeytown
 "In Your Wildest Dreams", a song by The Reverend Horton Heat from Liquor in the Front
 "In Your Wildest Dreams", a 1991 family drama film directed by Bruce Neibaur

See also
 "Your Wildest Dreams", a song by The Moody Blues from the album The Other Side of Life
 Wildest Dreams (disambiguation)
 In My Wildest Dreams (disambiguation)